Robledollano is a municipality located in the province of Cáceres, Extremadura, Spain. According to the 2006 census (INE), the municipality has a population of 403 inhabitants.

References

External links
Ayuntamiento de Robledollano
Robledollano - Corporción Municipal

Municipalities in the Province of Cáceres